The 1959 season of the Paraguayan Primera División, the top category of Paraguayan football, was played by 10 teams. The national champions were Olimpia.

Results

Standings

External links
Paraguay 1959 season at RSSSF

Para
Primera
Paraguayan Primera División seasons